Pre-colonial Philippine cuisine is composed of food practices of the indigenous people of the Philippines. Different groups of people within the islands had access to different crops and resources which resulted in differences in the way cooking was practiced. Native fruits, root crops, nuts and vegetables were eaten in the islands such as mango, Pili Nuts, Coconut, ginger etc. Meat and seafood was eaten all over the islands while certain Muslim groups did not consume the likes of pork and shellfish.

Accounts of Filipino cooking 
Various accounts of the foodstuffs Pre-colonial Filipinos had which can be assumed some of the dishes they now have are from/since ancient times. 

Cooking methods such as using bamboo to cook rice and meat has been reported, “Rice is cooked there under the fire in bamboos or in wood; and it lasts better
than that cooked in earthen pots.”

References

Philippine cuisine